James Blair (13 January 1947 – 6 April 2011) was a Scottish professional footballer who played as a striker. Active between 1967 and 1977 in Scotland, England and Belgium, Blair made 158 appearances in the Scottish Football League and the Football League, scoring 65 goals.

Born in Calderbank, Blair played youth football for Shotts Bon Accord before turning professional with St Mirren in 1967. Blair moved to Hibernian in 1970, before returning to St Mirren a year later. Blair played in England for Norwich City between 1973 and 1974, before playing with Belgian club K.V. Mechelen.

Blair died at his home in Belgium on 6 April 2011, at the age of 64.

References

1947 births
2011 deaths
Scottish footballers
Shotts Bon Accord F.C. players
St Mirren F.C. players
Hibernian F.C. players
Norwich City F.C. players
Scottish Football League players
English Football League players
Scottish expatriate footballers
Expatriate footballers in Belgium
Scottish expatriate sportspeople in Belgium
Belgian Pro League players
K.V. Mechelen players
Footballers from North Lanarkshire
Association football forwards
Scottish Junior Football Association players